Arabkir may refer to:
 Arapgir, (in Armenian: Arabkir or Kurdish: Erebgir), a town and district of Malatya Province, Turkey
 Arabkir (district), Yerevan, Armenia
Nor Arabkir, an upper middle class urban neighbourhood in Yerevan, the capital of Armenia. It is part of the Arabkir District of the city.
 Arabkir Yerevan, Armenian football team